Better may refer to:
 "to better" as a verb, meaning to undergo betterment
 better, an alternate spelling of bettor, someone who bets (gambles)

Music

Albums 
 Better (Chrisette Michele album), 2013
 Better (Brian McKnight album), 2016
 Better (Haley Reinhart album), 2016
 Better (BoA album), 2020

Songs 
 "Better" (The Screaming Jets song), 1991
 "Better" (Brooke Fraser song), 2004
 "Better" (Tom Baxter song)", 2007, covered by Boyzone in 2008
 "Better" (Guns N' Roses song), 2008
 "Better" (Maggie Rose song), 2012
 "Better" (Kim Hyung-jun song), 2014
 "Better" (Banks song), 2015
 "Better" (Haley Reinhart song), 2016
 "Better" (Meghan Trainor song), 2016
 "Better" (Mallrat song), 2017
 "Better" (Khalid song), 2018
 "Better" (Lena Meyer-Landrut and Nico Santos song), 2019
 "Better" (Twice song), 2020
 "Better" (Zayn song), 2020
 "Better" a 1992 song by Helmet from the album, Meantime
 "Better" a 1999 song by 8stops7 from the album, In Moderation
 "Better", a track from the 2000 single for the Erasure song, "Freedom"
 "Better", a 2001 song by Hoobastank from the album, Hoobastank
 "Better", a 2005 song by Plumb from the album, Chaotic Resolve
 "Better", a 2005 song by Sugababes from the album, Taller in More Ways
 "Better", a 2006 song by Toby Lightman from the album, Bird on a Wire
 "Better", a 2006 song by Regina Spektor from the album, Begin to Hope
 "Better", a 2010 song by Où Est Le Swimming Pool from the album, The Golden Year
 "Better", a 2012 song by Bow Wow
 "Better", a 2012 song by K'naan from the album, Country, God or the Girl
 "Better", a 2015 song by Chancellor
 "Better", a 2016 song by OneRepublic from the album, Oh My My
 "Better", a 2018 song by Estelle from the album, Lovers Rock
 "Better", a 2020 song by The Vamps from the album, Cherry Blossom

Organisations 
 Better, the brand name of British sport and leisure charity Greenwich Leisure Limited
Better.com, a mortgage lending company

Television 
 Better (talk show), also known as The Better Show, a syndicated lifestyle talk show and television program that was an extension of the magazine Better Homes and Gardens
Better (British TV series), a 2023 BBC drama series

See also 
 Better Man (disambiguation)

Stereotypes